The Last One may refer to:

Television
 "The Last One", an episode of Aqua Teen Hunger Force
 "Last Last One Forever and Ever", an episode of Aqua Teen Hunger Force
 "The Last One Forever and Ever (For Real This Time) (We ... Mean It)", an episode of Aqua Teen Hunger Force
 "The Last One" (St. Elsewhere), the 1988 final episode of St. Elsewhere
 "The Last One" (Friends), the final episode of Friends
 The Last One, a documentary by Neal Hutchenson featuring moonshine maker Marvin "Popcorn" Sutton

Other meanings
 The Last One (software), a computer program from the early 1980s which aimed to allow non-programmers to create application software
 The Last One , a Vertigo mini-series by J. M. DeMatteis
 "The Last One", a song by Cary Brothers, from the album Who You Are
 "The Last One", a song by Hieroglyphics, from the album 3rd Eye Vision

See also
Last One on Earth, 1992 album
 The Last Woman, 1976 French-Italian film
 Last One Standing (disambiguation)
 The Last Man (disambiguation)
The Last (disambiguation)
Last (disambiguation)